Means may refer to:

 Means LLC, an anti-capitalist media worker cooperative
 Means (band), a Christian hardcore band from Regina, Saskatchewan
 Means, Kentucky, a town in the US
 Means (surname)
 Means Johnston Jr. (1916–1989), US Navy admiral
 Means, in ethics, something of instrumental value that helps to achieve an end
 Means, an indicator of suspicion in a criminal investigation

See also
 Ways and means committee, a government body charged with reviewing and making recommendations for government budgets
 Mean (disambiguation)